Frank Reese Harvey is Professor Emeritus of mathematics at Rice University, known for contributions to the field of differential geometry. He obtained his Ph.D. from Stanford University in 1966, under the direction of Hikosaburo Komatsu. Over half of his work has been done in collaboration with Blaine Lawson. Their 1982 introduction of calibrated geometry, in particular, is among the most widely cited papers in differential geometry. It is instrumental in the formulation of the SYZ conjecture.

In 1983 he was an invited speaker at the International Congress of Mathematicians in Warsaw.

Major publications

References 

Living people
Rice University faculty
20th-century American mathematicians
Year of birth missing (living people)
Stanford University alumni
21st-century American mathematicians